Michael Joseph Buddie (born December 12, 1970) is an American former professional baseball pitcher and the current athletic director at the United States Military Academy. He played in Major League Baseball (MLB) from 1998 to 2002 with the New York Yankees and Milwaukee Brewers.

Baseball career
Buddie attended Wake Forest University, and in 1990 and 1991 he played collegiate summer baseball with the Cotuit Kettleers of the Cape Cod Baseball League. Buddie was selected by the New York Yankees in the fourth round of the 1992 MLB Draft. In 87 career games, he had a 5–4 record with a 4.67 ERA. He batted and threw right-handed. Buddie was also the pitching coach who prepared Kevin Costner for Costner's stint as a pitcher in Sam Raimi's film For Love of the Game (1999). Buddie also had a brief speaking role as the character Jack Spellman in that film.

Athletics administration career
After retiring from baseball in 2003, Buddie returned to his alma mater to begin a career in athletics administration.  He spent nearly a decade at Wake Forest serving in various postings within their athletic department. These included: sport administrator for baseball, women's soccer, and men's golf; assistant administrator for football and men's basketball; senior associate athletic director for administration/development; and director of the Varsity Club, as well as others.

In 2015, Buddie was hired to serve as athletic director at Furman University. While at Furman, Buddie negotiated a multi-year partnership with Nike, produced the athletic department's first balanced budget, and spearheaded an effort to bring the NCAA Men's Basketball Tournament back to upstate South Carolina in 2017 (landing two future tournament stops).  He also secured three separate $1 million endowments in support of the football and volleyball programs. While the AD, Furman won 26 Southern Conference championships under Buddie's leadership.

Buddie was named athletic director at the United States Military Academy on May 30, 2019.

References

External links

 Furman profile

1970 births
Living people
American expatriate baseball players in Canada
Army Black Knights athletic directors
Baseball players from Ohio
Columbus Clippers players
Cotuit Kettleers players
Furman Paladins athletic directors
Greensboro Hornets players
Indianapolis Indians players
Major League Baseball pitchers
Milwaukee Brewers players
New York Yankees players
Norwich Navigators players
Oneonta Yankees players
Ottawa Lynx players
People from Berea, Ohio
Tampa Yankees players
Wake Forest Demon Deacons baseball players
Saint Ignatius High School (Cleveland) alumni